Delirium is the name of three Frisbee rides located at three Cedar Fair parks – California's Great America, Kings Island, and Kings Dominion. The installation at California’s Great America, the smallest of the three, was designed by Chance Rides and opened in 2002. The installation at Kings Island was designed by HUSS Park Attractions and opened on April 12, 2003, as the largest Frisbee ride of its kind in the world. Mondial manufactured the version of Delirium at Kings Dominion, which opened in 2016.

History
Throughout the 1990s, roller coaster popularity soared as the number of roller coasters in the United States increased from roughly 165 to over 200 by the end of the decade.  As the U.S. economy slowed in 2001, however, many parks began to turn to more cost-effective thrill rides that weren't roller coasters, also known as "flat rides".

Paramount's Great America introduced their Delirium ride, designed by KMG and built by Chance Rides, in 2002.

Paramount's Kings Island decided to test the waters with larger-scale flat rides in 2002, when they introduced a Giant Top Spin ride manufactured by HUSS Park Attractions. HUSS Park Attractions (previously known as Huss Maschinenfabrik) spent most of its existence since the late 1970s creating small and mid-size flat rides for traveling carnivals and small amusement parks, but as the company evolved, they started developing rides that were bigger and accommodated larger numbers of riders. Following the success of the Giant Top Spin, originally known as Tomb Raider: The Ride, the park worked with HUSS to open another flat ride the following year in Kings Island's Action Zone.

Kings Dominion purchased a smaller Frisbee design from Mondial, also naming it Delirium, which was added in 2016 on the former site of Shockwave. It also swings in a pendulum motion while rotating clockwise.

Ride experience
The beginning of the line queue is positioned close to one side of the attraction, so that when the ride is in motion, the circular gondola appears to just miss the overhead canvas that protects from falling objects.  As a result, a strong breeze is felt by guests waiting in line.  Riders are later arranged into two groups of 25 before entering the final section of the line queue.  The restraints that secure riders are over the shoulder.

The ride begins with a hissing sound of air, and the metal platform separates into eight pie-shaped wedges as it retracts away from the gondola.  Into the first swing, the gondola immediately begins rotating slowly as each consecutive swing intensifies.  The rotation allows riders' experience to change throughout the entire ride, and at each swing's peak, a brief floating sensation can be felt.  Within thirty seconds, the pendulum reaches its maximum arc of 240 degrees.  As the ride cycle nears the end, the pendulum slows to a stop nearly as fast as it accelerated in the beginning.  Within a few swings, the gondola moves into a controlled stop as the loading platform lifts back into place.

References

External links
 Official Delirium page

Amusement rides manufactured by HUSS Park Attractions
Amusement rides manufactured by Mondial
Pendulum rides
Kings Island
Kings Dominion
Cedar Fair attractions